Emergentism is the belief in emergence, particularly as it involves consciousness and the philosophy of mind. A property of a system is said to be emergent if it is a new outcome of some other properties of the system and their interaction, while it is itself different from them. Within the philosophy of science, emergentism is analyzed both as it contrasts with and parallels reductionism.

Forms 
Emergentism can  be compatible with physicalism, the theory that the universe is composed exclusively of physical entities, and in particular with the evidence relating changes in the brain with changes in mental functioning. 

Some varieties of emergentism are not specifically concerned with the mind–body problem but constitute a theory of the nature of the universe comparable to pantheism. They suggest a hierarchical or layered view of the whole of nature, with the layers arranged in terms of increasing complexity with each requiring its own special science.

Relationship to vitalism 

Emmeche et al. (1998) state that "there is a very important difference between the vitalists and the emergentists: the vitalist's creative forces were relevant only in organic substances, not in inorganic matter. Emergence hence is creation of new properties regardless of the substance involved." "The assumption of an extra-physical vitalis (vital force, entelechy, élan vital, etc.), as formulated in most forms (old or new) of vitalism, is usually without any genuine explanatory power. It has served altogether too often as an intellectual tranquilizer or verbal sedative—stifling scientific inquiry rather than encouraging it to proceed in new directions."

History

Addressing emergentism  (under the guise of non-reductive physicalism) as a solution to the mind–body problem Jaegwon Kim has raised an objection based on causal closure and overdetermination.

Emergentism strives to be compatible with physicalism, and physicalism, according to Kim, has a principle of causal closure according to which every physical event is fully accountable in terms of physical causes. This seems to leave no "room"
for mental causation to operate. If our bodily movements were caused by the preceding state of our bodies and our decisions and intentions, they would be overdetermined. Mental causation in this sense is not
the same as free will, but is only the claim that mental states are causally relevant. If emergentists respond by abandoning the idea of mental causation, their position becomes a form of epiphenomenalism.

In detail: he proposes using the chart above (which was originally drawn with the $ by Nancey Murphy) that M1 causes M2 (these are mental events) and P1 causes P2 (these are physical events). P1 realises M1 and P2 realises M2. However M1 does not causally effect P1 (i.e., M1 is a consequent event of P1). If P1 causes P2, and M1 is a result of P1, then M2 is a result of P2. He says that the only alternatives to this problem is to accept dualism (where the mental events are independent of the physical events) or eliminativism (where the mental events do not exist).

See also

 Anomalous monism
 Clinamen
 Complex systems
 Elisionism
 Emergence
 Holism
 Reduction (philosophy)
 Special sciences
 Supervenience
 Synergetics (Fuller)
 Synergetics (Haken)

Notes

Further reading

 Beckermann, Ansgar, Hans Flohr, and Jaegwon Kim, eds., Emergence Or Reduction? Essays on the Prospects of Nonreductive Physicalism (1992).
 Cahoone, Lawrence, The Orders of Nature (2013).
 Clayton, Philip and Paul Davies, eds., The Re-emergence of Emergence: The Emergentist Hypothesis from Science to Religion. Oxford University Press (2008).
 Gregersen Niels H., eds., From Complexity to Life: On Emergence of Life and Meaning. Oxford University Press (2013).
 Jones, Richard H., Analysis & the Fullness of Reality: An Introduction to Reductionism & Emergence. Jackson Square Books (2013).
 Laughlin, Robert B., A Different Universe (2005).
 MacDonald, Graham and Cynthia, Emergence in Mind. Oxford University Press (2010).
 McCarthy, Evan, "The Emergentist Theory of Truth" (2015).
 Morowitz, Harold J., The Emergence of Everything: How the World Became Complex. Oxford University Press (2002).

External links
 Emergent Properties in the Stanford Encyclopedia of Philosophy.
 Emergentism in the Dictionary of Philosophy of Mind, 2007.
  Reduction and Emergence in Chemistry, Internet Encyclopedia of Philosophy.

Theory of mind
Emergence